The Spring Chicken is an Edwardian musical comedy adapted by George Grossmith, Jr. from Coquin de Printemps (1897) by Jaime and Duval, with music by Ivan Caryll and Lionel Monckton and lyrics by Adrian Ross, Percy Greenbank and Grossmith.

Produced by George Edwardes at the Gaiety Theatre in London, it opened on 30 May 1905. It ran for a very successful 401 performances.  The London production starred Grossmith, Harry Grattan, and Gertie Millar, with Henry Lytton later joining the cast. The Spring Chicken had a Broadway run in 1906 and toured in Britain and America.

Roles
 Gustave Babori   (Advocate) – George Grossmith, Jr.
 Boniface   (His Head Clerk) – Lionel Mackinder
 Baron Papouche   (His Client) – Harry Grattan
 Félix   (Head Waiter at "The Crimson Butterfly") – Robert Nainby
 Stephen-Henry   (Girdle's Son) – William Spray
 Proprietor of "The Crimson Butterfly" – Arthur Hatherton
 Alexis and Ferdinand (Babori's Clerks)  – George Gregory and Harry Taylor
 Waiter – Leigh Ellis
 Napoleon   (Office Boy) – Master Cross
 Joseph Boniface   (An Artist) – Charles Brown
 Inspector of Police – R. Tremayne
 Mr. Girdle   (Babori's Father-in-Law) – Edmund Payne
 Mrs. Girdle – Connie Ediss
 Baroness Papouche – Kate Cutler
 Dulcie Babori   (Babori's Wife) – Olive Morrell
 Emmy-Lou   (Girdle's Niece) – Olive May
 La Modiste – Isabelle Lidster
 Sylvana,  Thérèse and Henriette (Clients of Babori) – Gaynor Rowlands, Gertrude Glyn and Marguerite Gray
 Yvonne, Yvette and Céleste (Grisettes) – Kitty Mason, Fanny Dango (one of the Rudge Sisters), Ethel Oliver
 Rosalie – Gertie Millar

Musical numbers
ACT I - Office of M. Babori at his Residence, Paris
 No. 1 - Opening Chorus - "If we live in the land we love, we must love in the land we live..."
 No. 2 - Song - Baron & Chorus - "As one of the Old Noblesse, I'm eager to seek redress..."
 No. 3 - Trio - Baroness, Babori & Baron - "Were you my client, Baroness, I boldly should assert you..."
 No. 4 - Song - Dulcie - "When sun and showers awake the flowers to venture forth..."
 No. 5 - Quartet - Mr. & Mrs. Girdle, Emmy-Lou & Stephen-Henry - "It seemed a dreadful bore to leave our native shore..."
 No. 6 - Song - Girdle & Chorus - "I'm slightly past the age of thirty-one, and all the many foolish things I've done..."
 No. 7 - Song - Rosalie - "I'm a country lass, you know, fresh to all the streets and houses..."
 No. 8 - Concerted Piece - " Open windows, open doors, sprinkle tea-leaves on the floors..."
 No. 9 - Quartet - Rosalie, Emmy-Lou, Boniface & Stephen-Henry - " The swallow's a dear little bird..."
 No. 10 - Song - Mrs. Girdle & Chorus - " I don't say that husbands are all of them bad..."
 No. 11 - Concerted Number - "A modiste modeste, she has done her best to make us look all most exquisitely dressed! ..."
 No. 12 - March Song - Babori & Chorus - "When the Autumn leaves are falling, I can hear my conscience calling..."
 No. 13 - Duet - Rosalie & Girdle - "I'd like to go on a London spree ... Then come with me! ..."   (four verses)
 No. 14 - Finale Act I - "Here is news that's really very unpleasant!  We've been patiently waiting all the day..."
ACT II - Scene 1 - The Crimson Butterfly Restaurant, Malmaison.    Scene 2 - A Studio at Malmaison
 No. 15 - Opening Chorus - "If you're tired of having your meals 'mid the noise and the traffic of town..."
 No. 16 - Song - Felix & Chorus - "If the mysteries you're eager to unravel, of the world and all the doings of the day..."
 No. 17 - Duet - Rosalie & Boniface, with Chorus - "When I was a child about so high, and feeding the ducks and chickens..."
 No. 18 - Song - Rosalie & Chorus - "There once was a dear little girl you must know; you've heard of such girls, I think..."
 No. 19 - Song - Dulcie & Chorus - "When Gustave proposed to me, he went down on bended knee..."   (six verses)
 No. 20 - Song - Boniface & Chorus - "Do you know the jolly student band who come in joyous train? ..."
 No. 21 - Song - Baroness & Chorus - "I wanted to obtain advice from a lawyer at his leisure..."
 No. 22 - Duet - Babori & Girdle - "When a man is young, under thirty-five, he is handsomer, stronger and sounder..."
 No. 23 - Song - Rosalie & Chorus - "Here we are you see, in our dear Paris; all is love and laughter..."
 No. 24 - Recit. and Song - Babori & Chorus - "I am the manager of the National Theatre / The drama of Britain is limping..."
 No. 25 - Finale Act II - "So come to France when you've a chance..."   (reprise of parts of nos. 23 & 12)

References

External links
 Vocal score
 Information about the Broadway production
 Lists shows opening in London in 1905
 Photos of Gertie Millar as Rosalie

1905 musicals
West End musicals
Musicals based on films
British musicals